Rachel Carson Homestead is a National Register of Historic Places site in Springdale, Pennsylvania, United States, 18 miles northeast of Pittsburgh along the Allegheny River.

History 
The original four-room farmhouse was the birthplace and childhood home of Rachel Carson, whose 1962 book Silent Spring launched the modern environmentalist movement.  The Carson family moved to this home in 1901 with plans to live in the home temporarily, and to sell lots from the 65-acre land to finance building a modern home. Rachel was born here in 1907. The house underwent few improvements during the Carson residence, as financial difficulties prevented the family from accomplishing their plan. Carson and her family remained in this home until she completed her studies at the Pennsylvania College for Women (now Chatham University) in 1929. She continued her studies in Baltimore at Johns Hopkins University. Her family soon followed her to Baltimore. The house was sold to a local high school English teacher who updated utilities and added rooms, extending the footprint of the original home. The original four rooms used by the Carsons remain substantially unchanged. The grounds are reduced to a little more than a half-acre, but a small hiking trail accesses adjoining municipal property. A springhouse, still standing, was the source of water for the Carsons.

The homestead is managed by the Rachel Carson Homestead Association, Inc. (RCHA), a nonprofit organization. Established in 1975, the RCHA maintains the home, and welcomes visitors to tours and events. The mission of the Rachel Carson Homestead Association is to preserve, restore, and interpret Rachel Carson's birthplace; to design and implement environmental education programs; and to educate the community, guided by her environmental ethics and sense of wonder.

The organization established the Rachel Carson Legacy Challenge, which challenges individuals, government, industry and institutions to lessen their ecological footprint. The challenge uses Carson's environmental ethic as the benchmark for permanent and measurable change.

The Rachel Carson Challenge, a 35-mile wilderness hike on the Saturday closest to the summer solstice, was established in honor of Rachel Carson's contribution to the environment and passes by the Homestead. The Rachel Carson Trail is managed by the Rachel Carson Trails Conservancy.

Rachel Carson wrote her influential book Silent Spring at Rachel Carson House in Colesville, Maryland.

See also
Rachel Carson House (Colesville, Maryland), her home in later life
Rachel Carson Bridge

References

External links

Rachel Carson Homestead
Rachel Carson's Silent Spring, a visual history curated by the Michigan State University Museum
http://alleghenyrivernearpittsburgh.blogspot.com/

Houses completed in 1870
Homestead
Houses on the National Register of Historic Places in Pennsylvania
Museums in Allegheny County, Pennsylvania
Historic house museums in Pennsylvania
Biographical museums in Pennsylvania
Literary museums in the United States
Women's museums in the United States
Houses in Allegheny County, Pennsylvania
Pittsburgh History & Landmarks Foundation Historic Landmarks
National Register of Historic Places in Allegheny County, Pennsylvania
Birthplaces of individual people